Desert Driven is a 1923 American silent Western film starring Harry Carey.

Cast
 Harry Carey as Bob
 Marguerite Clayton as Mary
 George Waggner as Craydon
 Charles Le Moyne as Leary (as Charles J. Le Moyne)
 Alfred Allen as Yorke
 Camille Johnson as Ge-Ge
 Dan Crimmins as Brown
 Catherine Kay as Wife
 Thomas G. Lingham as Sheriff (as Tom Lingham)
 Jack Carlyle as Warden
 James Wang as Cook (as Jim Wang)
 Edward Cooper as Kendall

See also
 Harry Carey filmography

External links
 

1923 films
1923 Western (genre) films
American black-and-white films
Films directed by Val Paul
Film Booking Offices of America films
Silent American Western (genre) films
1920s American films
1920s English-language films